Manjacaze District is a district of Gaza Province in southwestern Mozambique. Its principal town is Manjacaze. The district is located at the south of the province, and borders with Panda District of Inhambane Province in the north, Inharrime and Zavala Districts of Inhambane Province in the east, Xai-Xai District in the south, and with Chibuto District in the west. In the southeast, the district is limited by the Indian Ocean. It has a population of 166,488 as of 2007.

Geography
The Changane River, a major left tributary of the Limpopo River, makes a border of the district with Chibuto District. Another major river is the Mangonhane River, a tributary of the Inharrime River. There are 63 lakes in the district, the biggest one is Lake Nhambavale.

The climate is tropical dry in the interior, and tropical humid at the coast.

Demographics
As of 2005, 45% of the population of the district was younger than 15 years. 49% of the population spoke Portuguese. The most common mother tongue among the population was Tsonga. 53% were illiterate, mostly women.

Administrative divisions
The district is divided into seven postos, Manjacaze (two localities), Chidenguele (four localities),  Nguzene (three localities), Chibonzane (three localities), Macuacua (two localities), Madzucane (three localities), and Chalala (two localities).

Economy
3% of the households in the district have access to electricity.

Agriculture
In the district, there are 38,000 farms which have on average  of land. The main agricultural products are corn, cassava, cowpea, peanut, sweet potato, and rice. Population of cattle, pigs, sheep, and goats was steadily growing prior to 2005.

Transportation

References

Districts in Gaza Province